Miroljub Kostić (born 5 June 1988) is a Serbian footballer who plays for Železničar Pančevo.

Honours
Jagodina
 Serbian Cup: 2012–13

Notes

References

External links
PrvaLiga profile 
New Player in FK Jagodina 

1988 births
Living people
Sportspeople from Niš
Serbian footballers
Serbian expatriate footballers
Association football midfielders
FK Sinđelić Niš players
FK Jagodina players
FK Radnik Surdulica players
Serbian First League players
Serbian SuperLiga players
Uzbekistan Super League players
Slovenian PrvaLiga players
NK Olimpija Ljubljana (2005) players
FK Sarajevo players
FK Novi Pazar players
FK Borac Čačak players
FK Napredak Kruševac players
FC AGMK players
FK Železničar Pančevo players
Expatriate footballers in Slovenia
Expatriate footballers in Uzbekistan
Expatriate footballers in Bosnia and Herzegovina
Serbian expatriate sportspeople in Slovenia
Serbian expatriate sportspeople in Uzbekistan
Serbian expatriate sportspeople in Bosnia and Herzegovina